is a Japanese long-distance runner. She competed in the senior women's race at the 2019 IAAF World Cross Country Championships. She finished in 95th place.

In 2019, she also competed in the women's 3000 metres steeplechase event at the Asian Athletics Championships held in Doha, Qatar. She finished in 10th place.

References

External links 
 

Living people
1996 births
Place of birth missing (living people)
Japanese female long-distance runners
Japanese female cross country runners
Japanese female steeplechase runners
20th-century Japanese women
21st-century Japanese women